The River Yar on the Isle of Wight, England, rises in a chalk coomb in St. Catherine's Down near Niton, close to the southern tip of the island. It flows across the Lower Cretaceous rocks of the eastern side of the island, through the gap in the central Upper Cretaceous chalk ridge of the Island at Yarbridge, then across the now drained Brading Haven to Bembridge Harbour in the northeast.

For most of its course, the river passes through rural areas. At Alverstone, a small weir uses water from the river to power a water mill.

The Yar is one of two rivers on the Isle of Wight with the same name. It is referred to as the Eastern Yar if it is necessary to distinguish between them with the other river being known as the Western Yar.

References

Ordnance Survey One Inch Seventh Series sheet 180

External links

Isle of Wight Estuaries Project

Yar, Eastern